Preece is a surname. Notable people with the surname include:

 Andy Preece, English footballer and manager
 David Preece (footballer born 1963)
 David Preece (footballer born 1976)
 Isaac Arthur Preece (1907-1964), British biochemist
 Jenny Preece, Dean of the College of Information Studies at the University of Maryland
 Lillian Preece (1928–2004), British swimmer
 Patricia Preece, English artist (born Ruby Preece)
 Steve Preece, American football player
 Tim Preece, English actor
 Warren E. Preece, editor of Encyclopædia Britannica from 1964 to 1975
 William Henry Preece, Welsh electrical engineer and inventor

See also
 Price
 Pryce
 Rhys#The patronymic form

English-language surnames